Raches is a village in the municipal unit of Skillounta, Elis, Greece. Its population in 2011 was 383. It is located near the Ionian Sea, between the Greek National Road 9 (E55, Patras - Pyrgos - Kyparissia) and the railway from Pyrgos to Kalamata. It is 2 km southeast of Anemochori, 2 km west of Kallikomo, 2 km northwest of Samiko and 5 km west of Krestena.

Population

See also

List of settlements in Elis

References

External links
Raches at the GTP Travel Pages

Skillounta
Populated places in Elis